Arnould Bonneville de Marsangy, born in Mons in 1802 and died in 1894 to Paris was a French magistrate.

He was a forerunner in the field of Criminology and originator of ideas such as the criminal (proposed in 1848 and introduced in 1850), parole (which he termed "preparatory liberations"), the generalization of fines in lieu of imprisonment or compensation for victims of a miscarriage of justice, as well, as recidivism.

Books
 De la récidive, ou des moyens les plus efficaces pour constater rechercher et réprimer les rechutes dans toute infraction à la loi pénale, 1844
 Des libérations préparatoires, 1846
 Traité des diverses institutions complémentaires du régime pénitentiaire, 1847
 Des pénalités pécuniaires au double point de vue de la répression des méfaits et du soulagement des classes indigentes, 1847
 De l'amélioration de la loi criminelle en vue d'une justice plus prompte, plus efficace, plus généreuse et plus moralisante, 1855 1
 Étude sur la moralité comparée de la femme, et de l'homme, au point de vue de l'amélioration des lois pénales et des progrès de la civilisation, 1862

References

External links
Bonneville de Marsangy, 1802-1894 un précurseur de la science criminelle moderne, par Sylvaine Ruopoli-Cayet : GoogleLivres (aperçu limité)

French criminologists
French magistrates
1802 births
1894 deaths
Prison reformers
19th-century French judges